The 1900 Ohio State Buckeyes football team represented the Ohio State University in the 1900 college football season.

Schedule

References

Ohio State
Ohio State Buckeyes football seasons
Ohio State Buckeyes football